James Elroy Flecker (5 November 1884 – 3 January 1915) was a British novelist and playwright. As a poet, he was most influenced by the Parnassian poets.

Biography
Herman Elroy Flecker was born on 5 November 1884 in Lewisham, London, to William Herman Flecker (d. 1941), headmaster of Dean Close School, Cheltenham, and his wife Sarah. His much younger brother was the educationalist Henry Lael Oswald Flecker (1896–1958), who became Headmaster of Christ's Hospital.

Flecker later chose to use the first name "James", either because he disliked the name "Herman" or to avoid confusion with his father. "Roy", as his family called him. was educated at Dean Close School, and then at Uppingham. He subsequently studied at Trinity College, Oxford, and at Gonville and Caius College, Cambridge. While at Oxford he was greatly influenced by the last flowering of the Aesthetic movement there under John Addington Symonds, and became a close friend of the classicist and art historian John Beazley.

From 1910 Flecker worked in the consular service in the Eastern Mediterranean. On a ship to Athens he met Helle Skiadaressi, and they were married in 1911.

Flecker died on 3 January 1915, of tuberculosis, in Davos, Switzerland and was buried in Bouncer's Lane Cemetery, Cheltenham. His death at the age of thirty was described at the time as "unquestionably the greatest premature loss that English literature has suffered since the death of Keats".

Works and influence
His contributions and biography was described by Geraldine Hodgson in 1925. She summarised his contribution in Life of James Elroy Flecker as "singular in our literature". This comment and her book in general received a damning review.

The excerpt from Flecker's verse drama Hassan  ... The Golden Journey to Samarkand inscribed on the clock tower of the barracks of the British Army's 22 Special Air Service regiment in Hereford provides an enduring testimony to Flecker's work:

The same inscription also appears on the NZSAS monument at Rennie Lines in the Papakura Military Camp in New Zealand, and at the Indian Army's Special Forces Training School in Nahan, Himachal Pradesh, India.

A character in the second volume of Anthony Powell's novel sequence, A Dance to the Music of Time, is said to be "fond of intoning" the lines For lust of knowing what we should not know / We take the Golden Road to Samarkand, without an attribution to Flecker. (This is in fact a misquotation, the original reads "...what should not be known").

Saki's short story "A Defensive Diamond" (in Beasts and Super-Beasts, 1914) references "The Golden Journey to Samarkand".

Agatha Christie quotes Flecker several times, especially in her final novel, Postern of Fate (1973).

Jorge Luis Borges quotes a quatrain from Flecker's poem "To a Poet a Thousand Years Hence" in his essay "Note on Walt Whitman" (available in the collection Other Inquisitions, 1937–1952):

Nevil Shute quotes from Hassan in Marazan (1926), his first published novel, and in the headings of many of the chapters in his 1951 novel Round the Bend.

The Pilgrims' Song from Hassan and its setting by Delius play a pivotal role at the beginning of Elizabeth Goudge's novel The Castle on the Hill (1942).

Tracy Bond quotes an amended stanza (not the original)  from Hassan in the 1969 film On Her Majesty's Secret Service as she looks out of the window of Piz Gloria at the sun rising over the Swiss alps:

The original in Flecker's play is more romantic, and makes clear that the Caliph is being addressed, not the Almighty:
In Flashman at the Charge (1973), author George MacDonald Fraser concludes a final scene with a decasyllable quatrain pastiche in Flecker’s style.  Following many misadventures suffered by the book’s picaresque hero Harry Flashman, brother-in-arms rebel leader Yakub Beg waxes poetic and evokes the mystique of middle Asia with its concomitant voyage of self-discovery and friendships hard-won by reciting:

Flecker's poem "The Bridge of Fire" features in Neil Gaiman's Sandman series, in the volume The Wake, and The Golden Journey to Samarkand is quoted in the volume World's End.

In Vikram Seth's "A Suitable Boy", the young English Literature lecturer Dr Pran Kapoor attempts to reduce colonial influence in the syllabus and suggests removing Flecker (to make room for James Joyce). Professor Mishra disagrees and quotes from "The Gates of Damascus"

Works

Poetry
The Bridge of Fire (1907)
Thirty-Six Poems (1910)
Forty-Two Poems (1911) (e-book)
The Golden Journey to Samarkand (1913)
The Old Ships (1915)
Collected Poems (1916)

Novels
The Last Generation: A Story of the Future (1908)
The King of Alsander (1914)

Drama
Hassan (1922; full title Hassan: The Story of Hassan of Baghdad and How he Came to Make the Golden Journey to Samarkand)
Incidental music to the play was written by Frederick Delius in 1920, before the play's publication, and first performed in September 1923.
Don Juan (1925)

Other
The Grecians (1910)
The Scholars' Italian Book (1911)
Collected Prose (1920)
The Letters of J.E. Flecker to Frank Savery (1926)
Some Letters from Abroad of James Elroy Flecker (1930)

References

Sources
 James Elroy Flecker (1922) by Douglas Goldring
 An Essay on Flecker (1937) by T. E. Lawrence
 No Golden Journey: A Biography of James Elroy Flecker (1973) by John Sherwood
 James Elroy Flecker (1976) by  John M. Munro
 "Hassan" (1922) by James Elroy Flecker, Windmill Press, as reprinted 1946

External links 

James Elroy Flecker Collection at the Harry Ransom Center
James Elroy Flecker Collection at University of Oxford
James Elroy Flecker material at the University of Leeds
 
 
 
 
The Golden Journey to Samarkand translated to Polish
 by Julian Lloyd Webber
To a Poet a Thousand Year Hence translated to Russian
 
 

1884 births
1915 deaths
People educated at Dean Close School
People educated at Uppingham School
20th-century deaths from tuberculosis
People from Cheltenham
Tuberculosis deaths in Switzerland
Writers from London
English male poets
English male dramatists and playwrights
English male novelists
20th-century English poets
20th-century English novelists
20th-century English dramatists and playwrights
20th-century English male writers